Svenska Cupen 1948 was the eighth season of the main Swedish football Cup and for the first time was not competed for by Allsvenskan clubs, because of the Summer Olympics in London. The Final was between two third division clubs and was held on 25 July 1948 at Olympia, Helsingborg. Råå IF won 6-0 against BK Kenty before an attendance of 9,852 spectators.

Preliminary round 1

For other results see SFS-Bolletinen - Matcher i Svenska Cupen.

Preliminary round 2

For other results see SFS-Bolletinen - Matcher i Svenska Cupen.

First round

For other results see SFS-Bolletinen - Matcher i Svenska Cupen.

Second round
The 8 matches in this round were played on 4 July 1948.

Quarter-finals
The 4 matches in this round were played on 11 July 1948.

Semi-finals
The semi-finals in this round were played on 18 July 1948.

Final
The final was played on 25 July 1948 at the Olympia Stadium.

Footnotes

References 

1948
Cup
Sweden